Peruru is a village located in Amalapuram Mandal, Dr. B.R. Ambedkar Konaseema district in the Indian state of Andhra Pradesh.

The local language is Telugu.

The village was said to be settled by two married children of Tamil Kings. The town is surrounded by coconut groves and water canals and possesses a rich heritage and architecture, including a town temple.

Location 
It is situated south of Amalapuram Mandal and Ambajipeta mandal, and east of Mamidikuduru Mandal and P. Gannavaram Mandal.

Nearby cities 

Amalapuram, Ambajipeta, P. Gannavaram, Razole, Palakol, Narsapuram, Bhimavaram and Antharvedhi.

Demographics 
The population of Peruru is 19,323 across 5,304 households.

Transport

Road 
Visitors can access Peruru from Amalapuram, a town 6 km away.

Public transport 
APSRTC has bus stations in Peruru and operates public transportation from nearby major cities.
Auto Rickshaws

Education

Colleges 
 S K B R College Amalapuram

Schools 
Dommeti Venkata Reddy Garu established the local high school.

 Sri Satya Sai Vidya Nikethan
 Sri Bhavishya English Medium Convent
 Govt.Schools

References 

Villages in Amalapuram Mandal